Puccinia subnitens is a plant pathogen that causes rust on Beta vulgaris.

See also 
 List of Puccinia species

References

External links 
 Index Fungorum
 USDA ARS Fungal Database

Fungal plant pathogens and diseases
Food plant pathogens and diseases
subnitens
Fungi described in 1895